Radio Shalom Sweden is a local associative radio station of Jewish sensitivity based in Stockholm, Sweden.

External links
 An entry at student.nada.kth.se 

Shalom Sweden, Radio
Jewish radio
Jews and Judaism in Stockholm
Mass media in Stockholm